Daglish railway station (officially Daglish Station) is a commuter railway station on the boundary of Daglish and Subiaco, suburbs of Perth, Western Australia. Opened on 14 July 1924, the station was named after Henry Daglish, who had been a mayor of Subiaco, a member for the electoral district of Subiaco, and a premier of Western Australia in the 1900s. Daglish was a resident of Subiaco for 22 years before he died in 1920. The station consists of an island platform accessed by a pedestrian underpass. Two small buildings are on the platform which operated as a parcels office and ticket office until 1970. The station is only partially accessible due to a steep access ramp and lack of tactile paving.

Daglish station is on the Fremantle and Airport lines, which are part of the Transperth public transport network. Services on each line run every 12 minutes during peak hour and every 15 minutes outside peak hour and on weekends and public holidays. At night, trains are every half-hour or hour.

Description

Daglish station is on the boundary of Daglish and Subiaco, suburbs of Perth, Western Australia. Parallel to the south-east is Railway Road and to the north-west is Stubbs Terrace. It is owned by the Public Transport Authority (PTA), a state government agency, and is part of the Transperth system. The adjacent stations are Subiaco station towards Perth or High Wycombe and Shenton Park station towards Fremantle or Claremont.

The station consists of a single island platform with two platform edges. The platform has an asphalt surface with concrete on the edges. At the south-west end of the platform is a pedestrian subway, accessed from the platform by a ramp. On the platform are two small red brick buildings under a single terracotta tiled roof. Between them is an undercover area for seating. The buildings display elements of the Federation Bungalow architectural style. The station building, platform, and underpass are largely the same as when originally built, with the main change being that the doors and windows are bricked in. Surrounding Daglish station is an ornamental garden, including a hedge that spells "DAGLISH". There are car parks on both sides of the station, with a total of 58 bays. The station is listed as an "assisted access" station on the Transperth website, as the access ramp is too steep and there is no tactile paving.

Immediately south-west of the station is a single-ended turnback siding. It was used by trains operating special event services for Subiaco Oval until the stadium was closed in 2017. Trains would park there before heading to West Leederville station to pick up passengers. It will be used by Morley–Ellenbrook line trains when that line opens in 2024. Those trains will not stop at Daglish station or any other station between Daglish and Perth. The turnback has capacity for five trains per hour, so an additional turnback will be needed for that line to achieve six trains per hour, which is planned in 2031.

History
By 1920, the Subiaco community wanted a railway station in the southern part of Subiaco. The Subiaco Municipal Council started lobbying the Government of Western Australia for a station to be built near Lawler Street. In 1922, after many meetings between the premier, the minister for railways, and the mayor of Subiaco, Walter Richardson, the government promised that the station would be built. The station was constructed during 1923 and the first half of 1924, during which time the station was often called Lawler Street station, although the station was actually slightly south of that street. It opened on 14 July 1924, and was named after Henry Daglish, who was a mayor of Subiaco, a member for the electoral district of Subiaco, and a premier of Western Australia in the 1900s. Daglish was a resident of Subiaco for 22 years before he died in 1920.

In 1925, the Municipality of Subiaco acquired the land north-west of the station. Previously planned to be used as a rail yard, the council planned to create a residential suburb there named Daglish. The development of the suburb spanned the following two decades.

Car parks at the station were built in the 1960s, with the Stubbs Terrace car park built around 1966–67 and the Railway Road car park built in 1969. In 1970, the then-operator of the railway network, Western Australian Government Railways, changed the way it handled freight. This meant that from 31 January 1970, the station's parcels office and ticket office no longer operated, and staff no longer worked at the station. The windows and doors to the station building were filled in with bricks, and the building is now occupied by electrical equipment. The station closed on 1 September 1979 along with the rest of the Fremantle line. It re-opened on 29 July 1983 when services on the Fremantle line were restored.

In May 2007, the turnback siding was opened between the mainline tracks south-west of the station, permitting the reversal of six-car trains moving special event crowds to and from Subiaco Oval. Since 10 October 2022, the station has been served by Airport line services in addition to the pre-existing Fremantle line services.

Services

Daglish station is served by the Airport and Fremantle lines on the Transperth network. Services are operated by Transperth Train Operations, a division of the PTA. The Fremantle line runs between Fremantle station and Perth station, continuing past Perth as the Midland line. The Airport line, which commenced regular services on 10 October 2022, goes between High Wycombe station and Claremont station.

Airport line and Fremantle line trains stop at Daglish every 12 minutes each during peak hour for a combined frequency of a train every 6 minutes. Outside peak hour and on weekends and public holidays, each line has a train every 15 minutes for a combined frequency of 7.5 minutes. Late at night, each line has a half-hourly or hourly frequency. Daglish station saw 186,725 passengers in the 2013–14 financial year. In 2015, the station had 644 average weekday boardings, making it the 50th busiest station out of the 69 Transperth stations at the time.

On Railway Road next to the station are a pair of bus stops. These are served by route 27, which runs between East Perth and Claremont station. These are also served by rail replacement bus route 906 when trains are not running.

Notes

References

External links

 Daglish Station information page from Transperth

Fremantle line
Railway stations in Perth, Western Australia
Railway stations in Australia opened in 1924
Subiaco, Western Australia
Airport line, Perth